John Harman may refer to:

Politicians
John Harman (Australian politician) (1932–1998), Speaker of the Legislative Assembly of Western Australia
John Harman (British politician) (born 1950), UK Labour Party politician
John Harman (MP) for Orford and Bletchingley

Others
John Harman, birth name of John Vesey, later Bishop Vesey.
John Harman (admiral) (died 1673), English naval officer
John B. Harman (1907–1994), British physician
John Harman (British Army soldier) (1914–1944), Victoria Cross recipient
John A. Harman (1824–1874), Confederate States Army officer